The Combined Military Hospital Rawalpindi is a tertiary care military hospital in Rawalpindi.  It is headed by a Major General from the Army Medical Corps (Pakistan). It provides specialized treatment to the armed forces personnel, their immediate families as well as civilians.

Hospital facilities
It is an A Class Combined Military Hospital. It is the chief medical hospital of the cantonment area of Rawalpindi, along with being a Military Hospital for the Armed Forces of Pakistan.

This 1000 bed hospital mainly looks after the surgical diseases and caters for all ranks of the Armed Forces. 
This hospital has these healthcare units in it:
 General Surgery
 Spine Surgery
 Neurosurgery
 Ear, Nose and Throat
 Eye
 Thoracic Surgery
 Vascular Surgery
 Laproscopic Surgery
 Facio-maxillary Surgery
 Urology
 Breast Surgery
 Burn Centre
 Trauma Centre
 Orthopedic 
There is also a battle casualty/artificial limb section attached to the hospital. This hospital has the only dedicated department of spine surgery in the country. The General Medical Council of UK recognizes the hospital for postgraduate training in different surgical fields. The medical students of Army Medical College are imparted clinical training by the concerned specialists and the professors.

In 2005, a study was conducted which aimed to identify the health hazards posed by the hospital wastes to the sanitary workers of this hospital. The study was to make recommendations for the improvement of the workers' health status.

In 2013, then Chief of Army Staff General Ashfaq Parvez Kayani inaugurated the newly constructed buildings of Outdoor Patient Department (OPD), Emergency Department and Diagnostic Department. This was to increase the combined hospital capacity of CMH and MH to 2500 beds. It was also stated, at the time, the hospital would be able to treat 6000 patients daily.

See also
 Army Medical College
 Pakistan Army Medical Corps
 Military Hospital Rawalpindi
 Combined Military Hospital Lahore

References

Hospitals in Rawalpindi
Hospitals with year of establishment missing
Military medical facilities in Pakistan
1859 establishments in British India